Oreodera albata is a species of beetle in the family Cerambycidae. It was described by Villiers in 1971.

References

Oreodera
Beetles described in 1971